A Haufendorf is an enclosed village with irregular plots of land and farms of greatly differing scale, usually surrounded by a stockade fence (German: Ortsetter). They are typically found in Germany, Austria and Switzerland, whence the name. Haufendörfer (pl.) differ from most other types of village in that they are irregularly laid out. A large number of Haufendörfer emerged in connexion with the medieval open field system (Gewanneflur), where each farmer farmed strips of different fields and the location of these field strips continually changed. The district (Gemarkung) was divided into the village core (Dorfkern), field system (Ackerflur) and common pasture (Allmende).

A Haufendorf is sometimes also referred to as a "clustered village" or "irregularly nucleated village".

References 

Rural geography
Settlement geography
Types of village
Villages in Germany